The Journal of the European Academy of Dermatology and Venereology is the official journal of the European Academy of Dermatology and Venereology. The journal is peer-reviewed monthly that publishes articles of general and practical interest in the field of dermatology and venereology on clinical and basic science topics, as well as research with practical implications. According to the Journal Citation Reports, the journal has a 2018 impact factor of 5.113.

References

English-language journals
Monthly journals
Dermatology journals
Sexually transmitted diseases and infections
Wiley-Blackwell academic journals
Academic journals associated with international learned and professional societies of Europe
Publications established in 1991
1991 establishments in Europe